Aleta Catarina Suarez (born Aleta Rodriguez Catarina) is a Filipina politician who last served as Member of the Philippine House of Representatives from Quezon's 3rd District, a position she held thrice from 2001–2004, 2013–2016, and 2019–2022. She is the wife of former Governor Danilo Suarez and the mother of incumbent 2nd District Representative David C. Suarez.

Personal life 
She married Danilo Suarez in 1969, at a church wedding ceremony in Ermita, Manila. Together, they have five children including David. They also have eight grandchildren as of 2019.

References 

Living people
Members of the House of Representatives of the Philippines from Quezon
People from Lucena, Philippines
Lakas–CMD (1991) politicians
Pwersa ng Masang Pilipino politicians
Year of birth missing (living people)